"Arabid race" was a historical term used by ethnologists during the late 19th century and early 20th century in an attempt to categorize a historically perceived racial division between peoples of Semitic ethnicities and peoples of other ethnicities. The term "Arabid race" was used in the late nineteenth, and early twentieth centuries. Its proponents saw it as part of the so called Caucasian race or even of a subspecies labelled Homo sapiens europaeus. It has been considered significantly outdated in the years since. Modern scientific consensus based on genetics rejects the concept of distinct human races in a biological sense.

In the early 20th century, Charles Gabriel Seligman described his perception of the occurrence of the "Arabid race" in the Sudan region:

See also
Historical race concepts
Semitic peoples
Mediterranean race
Irano-Afghan race

References

Historical definitions of race
19th-century introductions